The Ordem Militar de Cristo (Military Order of Christ), the full name of which is the Military Order of Our Knights of Lord Jesus Christ, is a Portuguese honorific Order which takes its name from the extinct Order of Christ (1834), which is given for distinguished service in the performance of functions in sovereign positions or public administration, and for the judiciary and diplomacy, which is seen as being particularly distinguished.

Degrees 
The Order of Christ Military consists of five levels:
  Grand Cross (GCC)
  Grand Officer (GOC)
  Commander (ComC)
  Officer (OC)
  Knight (CvC) / Dame (DmC)
Like other Portuguese Orders, the title of Honorary Member (MHC, going by its Portuguese acronym for Membro-Honorário) can also be bestowed on institutions and locations.

List of awardees 
19TH CENTURY
 Bernardino António Gomes (Cavaleiro)
 Antonio Joaquim da Fonseca Neves (presidente da Camara Municipal d'esta Cidate Aracaju Sergipe; Cavaleiro)
 Inácio de Sousa Rolim (Comendador)
 Manuel José Gavinho (comendador)
 José Gavinho Viana (comendador)
 Antônio José Gomes Bastos, 2º Barão de Catas Altas 
 Francisco José Pacheco, Segundo Barão de São Francisco Portugal, Visconde de São Francisco Brasil
20TH CENTURY
 Manuel de Almeida Amaral
 João Maria Feijóo
 Carlos Carvalhas
 Juvenal de Araújo
 Joaquim Maria de Mendonça Lino Netto
 Manuel José Pinto Osório
 Fernando Abbott Galvão
 Francisco Sá Carneiro, a título póstumo.
 Carlos Alberto da Mota Pinto
 Mário Soares, former Portuguese Prime Minister and former President of the Portuguese Republic.
 Leonardo Ribeiro de Almeida
 Freitas do Amaral
 Vítor Pereira Crespo
 Francisco Pinto Balsemão, former Portuguese prime minister
 Edvard Beneš, Czechoslovak politician and president
 Joaquim Letria, journalist.
 Ramalho Eanes, former Portuguese President
 Gonçalo Ribeiro Telles, architect
 Jaime Gama, professor, journalist and politician.
 Rui Machete
 Eurico de Melo, engineer and politician
 José Saraiva Martins
 Carlos Augusto Corrêa Paes d’Assumpção, posthumously
 João de Deus Pinheiro
 Aristides de Sousa Mendes, posthumously.
 António Alçada Baptista
 Carlos de Azeredo
 Cavaco Silva, President of the Portuguese Republic.
 Durão Barroso,  former prime minister of Portugal and ex-President of the European Commission.
 José Cutileiro
 Mota Amaral
 Vasco Joaquim Rocha Vieira
 António Cardoso e Cunha
 Filipe VI da Espanha, King of Spain.
 António Mega Ferreira
 Francisco Lucas Pires
 Nuno Krus Abecassis, posthumously.
 Ana Gomes
 José Menéres Pimentel
 António Guterres, former Prime Minister of Portugal. 
 João Salgueiro
 Francisco Seixas da Costa
 João Henrique Ulrich Jr.
 José Augusto Prestes (GOC), former president of C.R. Vasco da Gama.
 Cyro Aranha, former president of C.R. Vasco da Gama.
21ST CENTURY
 Pedro Santana Lopes, former Portuguese Prime Minister.
 António Pinto da França
 Gonçalo Santa Clara Gomes
 Fernando Andersen de Guimarães
 José Luís Gomes
 Manuel Fernandes Pereira
 João de Vallera
 Álvaro Mendonça e Moura
 Miguel Sousa (comendador)
 António Vitorino
 António Barreto
 Manuela Ferreira Leite
 João Salgueiro
 Pedro Pires de Miranda
 António de Almeida Santos
 Henrique Nascimento Rodrigues
 Eduardo Catroga
 Rui Moura Ramos
 Fernando Pinto Monteiro
 Carlos César
 Luís Vasco Valença Pinto
 José António Mesquita
 Alexandre do Nascimento
 José Souto de Moura
 José Manuel Garcia Mendes Cabeçadas
 D. Letícia Ortiz Rocasolado (Queen of Spain)
 Fernando Teixeira dos Santos
 Mariano Gago
 Assunção Esteves
 Guilherme d'Oliveira Martins
 Alberto João Jardim

Institutions 
 Associação Académica de Coimbra
 Club Sport Marítimo
 Colégio Militar
 Faculdade de Medicina da Universidade Federal do Rio de Janeiro
 Instituto Militar dos Pupilos do Exército
 Sociedade Histórica da Independência de Portugal 
 Sporting Clube de Portugal
 Sport Lisboa e Benfica
 Club de Regatas Vasco da Gama
 Corpo de Polícia de Segurança Pública da Província de Cabo Verde (1974)
 Polícia de Segurança Pública (1988)
 Corpo de Polícia de Segurança Pública de Macau (1991)
 Atlético Clube de Portugal (1951)

List of council members 
 Kaúlza de Arriaga (1966-1974)

See also 
 Ordens honoríficas de Portugal
 Ordem de Cristo, for a historical context of medieval military order.
 Imperial Ordem de Nosso Senhor Jesus Cristo, Brazilian order created from the former Portuguese royal order.
 Official site of the Grão-Mestre das Ordens Honoríficas Portuguesas.

Orders, decorations, and medals of Portugal